Triangle railway station was a railway station near Triangle on the Rishworth Branch built by the Lancashire & Yorkshire Railway.

When open, services ran to  heading north, and to  heading south. Only the station house remains.

References

External links 
 Triangle station on navigable 1947 O. S. map

Disused railway stations in Calderdale
Former Lancashire and Yorkshire Railway stations
Railway stations in Great Britain opened in 1885
Railway stations in Great Britain closed in 1929
1885 establishments in England